Andrea Ferretti may refer to:

Andrea Ferretti (footballer, born 1985), Italian footballer who plays for Scandicci
Andrea Ferretti (footballer, born 1986), Italian football striker for Imolese